USI: Under Special Investigation  is an investigative news series by TV5. It aired from March 14, 2010, to August 5, 2012. It airs every Sunday on AksyonTV at 7:00 p.m. (PST) and 11:00 p.m. on TV5 (PST).

Host
Paolo Bediones

Background
The show is hosted by Paolo Bediones who came from GMA Network. On its months of airing, it features different presidential candidates during the elections of 2010. After the elections, the show focuses only on the different issues that made headlines.

See also
List of programs aired by TV5 (Philippine TV network)
Sapul sa Singko
Aksyon JournalisMO
Radyo5 92.3 News FM

TV5 (Philippine TV network) original programming
Philippine documentary television series
2010 Philippine television series debuts
2012 Philippine television series endings
Filipino-language television shows